Aliger gallus, previously known as Strombus gallus, common name the rooster conch or rooster-tail conch, is a species of medium-sized sea snail, a marine gastropod mollusk in the family Strombidae, the true conchs.

Distribution
This species is found from southeast Florida and Bermuda through the West Indies and south to Brazil.

Description
The average shell length of this species is about 12.5 cm.

The maximum recorded shell length is 197 mm.

Habitat 
The minimum recorded depth for this species is 0.3 m.; the maximum recorded depth is 82 m.

Phylogeny

The phylogenetic relationships among the Strombidae have been mainly accessed on two occasions, by Simone (2005) and Latiolais (2006), using two distinct methods. Simone proposed a cladogram (a tree of descent) based on an extensive morpho-anatomical analysis of representatives of Aporrhaidae, Strombidae, Xenophoridae and Struthiolariidae, which included L. gallus (there referred to as Aliger gallus).

With the exception of Lambis and Terebellum, the remaining taxa were previously allocated within the genus Strombus, including L. gallus. However, according to Simone, only Strombus gracilior, Strombus alatus and Strombus pugilis, the type species, remained within Strombus, as they constituted a distinct group based on at least five synapomorphies (traits that are shared by two or more taxa and their most recent common ancestor). The remaining taxa were previously considered as subgenera, and were elevated to genus level by Simone in the end of his analysis. The genus Aliger (now considered a synonym of Lobatus), in this case, included Aliger gallus (now considered a synonym of Lobatus gallus) and Aliger costatus (= Lobatus costatus), which were thus considered closely related.

In a different approach, Latiolais and colleagues (2006) proposed another cladogram that attempts to show the phylogenetic relationships of 34 species within the family Strombidae. The authors analysed 31 species in the genus Strombus includingLobatus gallus (there referred to as Strombus gallus), and three species in the allied genus Lambis. The cladogram was based on DNA sequences of both nuclear histone H3 and mitochondrial cytochrome-c oxidase I (COI) protein-coding gene regions. In this proposed phylogeny, Strombus gigas (= Lobatus gigas) and Strombus gallus are closely related and appear to share a common ancestor.

References

Further reading 
 Rosenberg, G., F. Moretzsohn, and E. F. García. 2009. Gastropoda (Mollusca) of the Gulf of Mexico, Pp. 579–699 in Felder, D.L. and D.K. Camp (eds.), Gulf of Mexico–Origins, Waters, and Biota. Biodiversity. Texas A&M Press, College Station, Texas
 Maxwell S.J., Dekkers A.M., Rymer T.L. & Congdon B.C. (2020). Towards resolving the American and West African Strombidae (Mollusca: Gastropoda: Neostromboidae) using integrated taxonomy. The Festivus. 52(1): 3–38.

External links

 Linnaeus, C. (1758). Systema Naturae per regna tria naturae, secundum classes, ordines, genera, species, cum characteribus, differentiis, synonymis, locis. Editio decima, reformata [10th revised edition], vol. 1: 824 pp. Laurentius Salvius: Holmiae
 

Strombidae
Gastropods described in 1758
Taxa named by Carl Linnaeus